The Tanaoceridae are an insect family in the monotypic superfamily Tanaoceroidea in the suborder Caelifera. They are sometimes called desert long-horned grasshoppers.

Genera
Tanaoceridae comprises two genera: 
 Mohavacris Rehn, 1948
 Tanaocerus Bruner, 1906
 Type species: Tanaocerus koebelei Bruner, 1906

Description

Grasshoppers in the Tanaoceridae have antennae that are thin and at least as long as the body, and therefore might be confused with members of the Ensifera (rather than Caelifera). They are slender to medium-sized, grey-spotted grasshoppers with powerful jumping hind legs. The two innermost joints of the antennae are short and thick, the other joints long and thin, so that the antenna is at least as long as the body. The facet eyes are round and protruding. These species are apterous, and the thorax is rather small, with a collared pronotum.

They live in dry areas and are active at night and in winter when it is relatively cool. Mohavacris timberlakei are found on wormwood shrubs ("sagebrush" or Artemisia spp.), Where they are excellently camouflaged and resemble pieces of bark, while the Tanaocerus species live both in the bushes and on the ground. The eggs are probably laid in the ground and hatch in the autumn.

References

Caelifera
Orthoptera families
Orthoptera of North America